Water in Africa is an important issue encompassing the sources, distribution and economic uses of the water resources on the continent. Overall, Africa has about 9% of the world's fresh water resources and 16% of the world's population. Among its rivers are the Congo, Nile, Zambezi, Niger and Lake Victoria, considered the world’s second largest lake. Yet the continent is the second driest in the world, with millions of Africans still suffering from water shortages throughout the year.

These shortages are attributed to problems of uneven distribution, population boom and poor management of existing supplies. Sometimes there are smaller numbers of people residing where there is large amount of water. For example, 30 percent of the continent's water lies in the Congo basin inhabited by only 10 percent of Africa’s population. There is significant variation in the rainfall patterns observed in different places and time. There is also high evaporation rates in some parts of the region resulting in lower percentages of precipitation in such places. However, there is very significant inter-and intra-annual variability of all climate and water resources characteristics, so while some regions have sufficient water, sub-Saharan Africa faces numerous water-related challenges that constrain economic growth and threaten the livelihoods of its people. African agriculture is mostly based on rain-fed farming, and less than 10% of cultivated land in the continent is irrigated. The impact of climate change and variability is thus very pronounced. The main source of electricity is hydropower, which contributes significantly to the current installed capacity for energy. The Kainji Dam is a typical hydropower resource generating electricity for all the large cities in Nigeria as well as their neighbouring country, Niger. Hence, the continuous investment in the last decade, which has increased the amount of power generated.

Solutions to the challenges of water for energy and food security are hindered by shortcomings in water infrastructure, development, and management capacity to meet the demands of a rapidly growing population. This is compounded by the fact Africa has the fastest urbanization rates in the world. Water development and management are much more complex due to the multiplicity of trans-boundary water resources (rivers, lakes and aquifers). Around 75% of sub-Saharan Africa falls within 53 international river basin catchments that traverse multiple borders. This particular constraint can also be converted into an opportunity if the potential for trans-boundary cooperation is harnessed in the development of the area’s water resources. A multi-sectoral analysis of the Zambezi River, for example, shows that riparian cooperation could lead to a 23% increase in firm energy production without any additional investments. A number of institutional and legal frameworks for transboundary cooperation exist, such as the Zambezi River Authority, the Southern African Development Community (SADC) Protocol, Volta River Authority and the Nile Basin Commission. However, additional efforts are required to further develop political will, as well as the financial capacities and institutional frameworks needed for win-win multilateral cooperative actions and optimal solutions for all riparians.

Sources of water

Ground water

Groundwater plays a key role in sustaining water supplies and livelihoods in sub-Saharan Africa especially due to its widespread availability, generally high quality, and intrinsic ability to buffer episodes of drought and increasing climate variability.

Yet there is limited sources available to provide clean drinkable water in Africa, one of the research conducted in 2007 has shown that over 40% of Africans use groundwater as their main source of drinking water, particularly in North and Southern African countries.

While the hydrogeological and climatic features of any given region dictate the availability and replenishment of groundwater, the future quantity and quality of groundwater depends to a large extent on the land use and management practices of the communities viii within an aquifer province

Piped water is still the most important source of drinking water (39%) in urban areas, yet boreholes are becoming more important (24%). The WHO (2006) stated that, in 2004, only 16% of people in sub-Saharan Africa had access to drinking water through a household connection (an indoor tap or a tap in the yard). Even when there is available water in these places, there is poor access to readily accessible drinking water as there are risks of contamination due to several factors. Factors such as poor maintenance due to limited financial resources, pollution and poor sanitation sometimes due to limited financial resources. When wells are built and water sanitation facilities are developed, sometimes water quality testing is not performed as often as is necessary, and lack of education among the people utilizing the water source.

Surface water

World Health Organisation (WHO) in 2015 reported that about 159 million people fetched untreated surface water from lakes, ponds, rivers and streams globally. Surface water sources in Africa are sometimes highly polluted. Factors such as sewage discharges, oil pollution, industrial factors etc. For example, Niger Delta which is home to much of Nigeria’s oil industry of which about 2 million barrels of oil are extracted from the area daily, has contaminated water due to spills.

Water, jobs and the economy 
Africa has recently undergone its best decade (2005-2015) for economic growth since the post-independence period. The growth, however, has neither been inclusive or equitable. According to the World Bank, GDP growth in sub-Saharan Africa averaged 4.5% in 2014, up from 4.2% in 2013, supported by continuing infrastructure investment, increased agricultural production and buoyant services.

Africa’s population surpassed the 1 billion mark in 2010 and is projected to double by 2050. 

Demographically, it is expected to be the fastest growing region in the world with the growth varying, depending on sub-regions. Furthermore, the growth is skewed to the young and that component of the population that will need jobs is expected to increase rapidly and comprise 910 million out of the projected two billion total population by 2050. Most of the growth in workforce will be in Sub-Saharan Africa (about 90%). Hence, the demand for jobs will be a major policy issue across the continent, which is already experiencing high unemployment and underemployment; moreover, the latter is driving both migration within the region and emigration towards Europe and other regions.

Job creation for this anticipated growth in population is set to be the major challenge for Africa’s structural economic and social transformation. It is estimated that in 2015, 19 million young people will be joining the sluggish job market in Sub-Saharan Africa and four million in North Africa. The demand for jobs is expected to increase to 24.6 million annually in Sub-Saharan Africa and 4.3 million in North Africa by 2030, representing two thirds of global growth in demand for jobs. Youth unemployment has been the trigger for uprisings, notably in North Africa, and has led to social and security instability.

The key water-dependent or related sectors with the potential for meeting part of the current and projected demand for jobs in Africa are social services, agriculture, fisheries and aquaculture, retail and hospitality, manufacturing, construction, natural resources exploitation (including mining) and energy production (including hydro, geothermal and expected fracking for oil and natural gas). All these sectors depend to a varying extent on the availability of, access to, and reliability of water resources. Irresponsible water use by some sectors can create short-term employment, but result in negative impacts on the availability of water resources and jeopardize future jobs in other water-dependent sectors. Climate change, water scarcity and variability have direct impact on the major sector outputs and thus ultimately on the overall economy of most African countries.

Challenges

Water scarcity

Impacts of climate change 

Climate change is likely to have a significant impact on water resources, with the 5th Assessment Report of the Intergovernmental Panel on Climate change suggesting 7% of the total world population being affected by decreasing availability of renewable water sources with each degree of global warming. Climate change is expected to amplify existing stress on water availability in Africa, however this impact is likely to modest compared to driver such as population growth, urbanization, agricultural growth and land-sue change. While multiple factors will impact water availability in Africa, climate change will contribute to water shortages in North Africa and Southern Africa. In North Africa, climate change may account for 22% of total water shortage in the region. Climate change as well as socio-economic drivers are also expected to intensify water scarcity in Southern Africa as increasing temperatures and variable rainfall lead to reduced streamflows in rivers across the region. Climate change is also likely to result in increased hydrological extremes, such as droughts which are expected to last longer and happen more often in Southern Africa, placing considerable stress on water supply. In East Africa changes in water resources are uncertain, as climate models in the region predict either increases or decreases in total rainfall over the region. Increasing temperature may increase evaporation and lead to shrinking glaciers and ice cover, which may place strain on water resource. However future projects indicate an increase in the intensity of rainfall which is likely to result in increased streamflows in regions such as the Lake Victoria Basin.

The issue of water scarcity was first raised in the United Nations Conference on Environment and Development at Rio de Janeiro, Brazil, in 1992.

Future developments 
Water is crucial for success of Sustainable Development Goals (SDG) in Africa. The above commodity remains essential in such was that it will plays a key role in achieving the SDG 1 which calls for an end to poverty in all its manifestations by 2030.

For Africa to be able to meet the Sustainable Development Goals and maintain the impressive growth rates of the last 10 years, the basic infrastructures of water, electricity and transportation are prerequisites. Without these basics, the African economies will lose the momentum of the last decade, which will lead to not only loss of direct water jobs, but also jobs in all the other sectors dependent on water. An illustrative example is the case of Ghana which is often cited as one of the best examples of economic recovery in Africa.

Jobs in water-dependent sectors 
Currently, the most important water-dependent sector in Africa is agriculture, which forms the bedrock of most economies of African states. Both rain-fed and irrigated agriculture are important job-providing sectors in all African countries.

Agriculture 

The role of agriculture as the main source of employment is decreasing in many African countries as a sustained growth in many economies is leading to increasing standards of living, improved education and the occurrence of rapid rural-urban migration of educated youth in search of white collar jobs. However, for the foreseeable future agriculture will still be a major source of employment, especially in non-oil producing African states. There is a rising paradox of increasing unemployment in the rapidly urbanizing cities and towns of Africa: labour shortages in rural areas are leading to significant reduction in food production and increased dependence of many African countries on food imports.

Based on Food and Agriculture Organization of the United Nations statistics, agriculture was the source of employment for 49% of Africans by 2010 and is a reflection of a gradual decline from 2002 to 2010, which coincides with the period of sustained GDP growth in most African countries. In spite of this decline, agriculture is expected to create eight million stable jobs by 2020 based on the trends from the McKinsey Global Institute analysis. If the continent accelerates agricultural development by expanding large scale commercial farming on uncultivated land and shifts production from low-value grain production to more labour-intensive and higher value-added horticultural and bio fuel crops (a good example is Ethiopia), as many as six million additional jobs could be created continent-wide by 2020. However, such estimates do not take account of the potential displacement or disappearance of existing jobs. These would need to be carefully assessed in terms of social, economic and environmental impacts in the overall context of responsible agricultural investment.

Health 
Improving Health in Africa is directly related to the use of an improved water source which contributes in reducing water-born diseases.
]

According to the World Health Organization (WHO)'s strategy for 2018–2025, the inadequate water, sanitation and hygiene have caused 842,000 diarrhea deaths in 2012, and deaths from several other diseases especially in Sub-Saharan Africa.

Cholera remains endemic in more than 47 countries, with an estimated 40–80 million people in Africa living in cholera hotspots.

The Agenda 21 adopted by the United Nations with regard to sustainable development the Earth Summit (UN Conference on Environment and Development) held in Rio de Janeiro, Brazil, in 1992 aims at assessing the consequences which people have on the environment to support measures aimed especially at controlling water borne diseases.

According to the WHO report, contaminated water can not only transmit diseases such diarrhea but also cholera, dysentery, typhoid and polio.

Fisheries 

The African fisheries and aquaculture sector employed 12.3 million people in 2014 and contributed US $24 billion or 1.26% of the GDP of all African countries, which improved food security and nutrition. About half of the workers in the sector were fishers and the rest were processors (mainly women) or aquaculturists.

Fisheries and aquaculture contribution to GDP in Africa by sub-sector

Employment by subsector

Manufacturing and industry 

Many manufacturing industries in Africa are water-dependent. The share of jobs is lower than in agriculture, even though the industries cited are considered as water intensive. In 2011, Ghana’s economy grew at 14% with the onset of its first production of oil. However, in 2015 the growth rate was expected to be only 3.9%. This can be attributed to a great extent to the failure to provide the basic water and energy infrastructure to meet the needs of a rapidly growing economy. Ghana is mainly dependent on the Akosombo hydroelectric dam on the Volta River for electricity. Due to reduced inflows from low rainfall, the hydroelectric dam was operating merely at half of its capacity in 2015. This was exacerbated by disruptions mainly in geothermal plants. In June 2015, all electricity was being rationed at 12 hours on, and 24 hours off. Though this is extreme, it reinforces the need for water infrastructure to sustain production and jobs in the nascent African economies. Anecdotal evidence from trade unions and employers in Ghana indicate that tens of thousands of stable jobs were lost in 2015 and the investment climate has turned sour, forcing Ghana to seek International Monetary Fund macro-economic support again. These policy instruments are underpinned by strategies and programmes, including the New Partnership for African Development Program (NEPAD), Program for Infrastructure Development in Africa (PIDA) and many others, which include the integrated development of Africa’s water resources for socio-economic development and poverty alleviation and eradication. The AU Agenda 2063, for example, aspires to a prosperous Africa based on inclusive growth and sustainable development. It specifically aims for an Africa that shall have equitable and sustainable use and management of water resources for socio-economic development, regional cooperation and the environment, and calls for the following action among others:

Policy frameworks

African Water Policy Framework and impact on jobs 
The African Policy Framework for the water sector comprise a series of high-level declarations, resolutions and programmes of action on the development and use of the continent’s water resources for socio-economic development, regional integration and the environment. These include the African Water Vision 2025 and its Framework of Action, the African Union (AU) Extraordinary Summit on Water and Agriculture, the AU Sharm El Sheikh Declaration on Water and Sanitation, and most importantly, the Agenda 2063 –The Africa We Want.

These policy instruments are underpinned by strategies and programmes, including the New Partnership for African Development Program (NEPAD), Program for Infrastructure Development in Africa (PIDA) and many others, which include the integrated development of Africa’s water resources for socio-economic development and poverty alleviation and eradication.

The AU Agenda 2063, for example, aspires to a prosperous Africa based on inclusive growth and sustainable development. It specifically aims for an Africa that shall have equitable and sustainable use and management of water resources for socio-economic development, regional cooperation and the environment, and calls for the following action among others. ‘Support Young people as drivers of Africa’s renaissance, through investment in their health, education and access to technology, opportunities and capital, and concerted strategies to combat youth unemployment and underemployment. Encourage exchange and Pan-Africanism among young people through the formation of African Union Clubs in all schools, colleges and universities. Ensure faster movement on the harmonization of continental admissions, curricula, standards, programmes and qualifications and raising the standards of higher education to enhance the mobility of African youth and talent across the continent by 2025’.

Gallery

See also 

 WASH (water, sanitation and hygiene)

References

Sources 

 
Water conservation
A